Plémy (Gallo: Plémic) is a commune in the Côtes-d'Armor department of Brittany in northwestern France.

Population

Inhabitants of Plémy are called plémytains or plémytens in French.

See also
Communes of the Côtes-d'Armor department

References

External links

Communes of Côtes-d'Armor
Côtes-d'Armor communes articles needing translation from French Wikipedia